Pauline Maria Tutein (1725–1799) was a Danish philanthropist whose portrait was featured on the Danish 20 kroner banknote.

She was first married to Ernst Bruckner. After his death, she married Peter Tutein (1724–1799), who was a member of the Grosserersocietetet since 1769.

In 1796, she made a 4000 Danish rigsdaler donation for the establishment of a girls' school under Sankt Petri Schule in Copenhagen.

Portrait
 
Jens Juel painted her portrait in 1779, which is featured on the front side of the Danish 20 kroner banknote of the Jens Juel series.

References

1725 births
1799 deaths
Danish philanthropists
Danish women philanthropists
Pauline Maria Tutein
18th-century philanthropists